The list of Olympic men's ice hockey players for the Netherlands consists of 18 skaters and 2 goaltenders. Men's ice hockey tournaments have been staged at the Olympic Games since 1920 (it was introduced at the 1920 Summer Olympics, and was permanently added to the Winter Olympic Games in 1924). The Netherlands have participated in one tournament: the 1980 Winter Olympics, where they played five preliminary-round games, and finished ninth of the twelve nations competing.

Four players (Dick Decloe, Corky de Graauw, Jack de Heer, and William Klooster) tied for the lead in goals, with 3 each, while de Graauw had the most assists, 5, and points, 8.

Key

Goaltenders

Skaters

See also
 Netherlands men's national ice hockey team

Notes

References
 
 
 
 

Ice hockey
Netherlands
Netherlands men's national ice hockey team
Netherlands